Francisco Ibañez may refer to:

Francisco Ibáñez de Peralta (1644–1712), Spanish Royal Governor of Chile
Francisco Ibáñez Talavera (1936), Spanish comic book artist and writer
Francisco Ibáñez (composer) (born 1950) Basque composer
Francisco Ibáñez (footballer, born 1986), Chilean football forward
Francisco Ibáñez (footballer, born 1998), Uruguayan football centre-back